Drin may refer to:

Drin (river), a river in Albania, Kosovo and North Macedonia
Drin Valley, the valley in northern and eastern Albania, North Macedonia, and Kosovo along the Drin river
 Drin, a townland in County Down, Northern Ireland
 Drins, a group of chlorinated insecticides whose names end in "drin"